Thomas Newman Thurlby (born November 9, 1938) is a Canadian former professional ice hockey defenceman who briefly played in the National Hockey League for the Oakland Seals.

Career statistics

Regular season and playoffs

External links

1938 births
Living people
Canadian ice hockey defencemen
Houston Apollos players
Ice hockey people from Ontario
Oakland Seals players
Sportspeople from Kingston, Ontario